Tarjinder Singh (born 22 December 1987) is an Indian first-class cricketer who plays for Assam. Singh is a right-handed middle order batsman. He made his first-class debut against Rajasthan at Udaipur in 2005-06 Ranji Trophy.

References

External links
 
 

1987 births
Living people
Indian cricketers
Assam cricketers
Cricketers from Guwahati
Cricketers from Assam